Killahara Castle is a castle in Ireland, located in the Dovea Upper Townland of Thurles. It is near the villages of Dovea and Loughmore in County Tipperary and about 15 minutes from the main Dublin to Cork motorway.

History 
The castle was originally built  1550 for Donagh O'Fogartie, the Chief of the O'Fogartie clan who controlled large areas of North Tipperary at that time. When the Chief was killed in battle in 1583, ownership passed through his widow, a Purcell, to the Purcell clan.

During the Cromwellian purges in 1649, the Purcells were expelled as 'forfeiting papists'. Cromwell's forces ransacked the building and removed the roof. The Fogartie/Purcell lands were awarded to an English adventurer, Annesley.

The lands and now ruined castle were transferred in the early 18th century to the Trants who already owned large tracts of land in Kerry. The Trants controlled the lands remotely until a branch of the Trant family built an estate house (Dovea House) in the early 1830s.

Tenants of the Trants lived in the semi-derelict castle up to 1850 when one Black Jack Fogarty, no doubt a descendant of the original chieftains, died there, beggared by the Great Famine.

In 1852, John Trant commissioned a restoration project for the Castle. He had only partially completed this when his attention moved to building a village (Dovea) and church for workers he had brought in from the UK.

In 1903, Fitzgibbon Trant attempted a further restoration project, after which his aunt Emily took up residence for a period.

In 1920, the Castle was burnt out by the Black and Tans, a notorious British auxiliary force brought in to try to crush the Irish bid for independence.

In 2006, the Dovea Estate sold the Castle and new owners undertook the project of making the castle habitable, under the guidance of conservation experts. The project was completed in 2009.

Spirit of the Castle 

The original Fogartie clan's motto was 'Fleadh agus Failte' - festivities and welcomes. That is the spirit which the conservation team chose as the spirit they set out to restore to the building.

References

External links
 Killahara Castle

Castles in Ireland
Thurles